Zaboli Mahalleh-ye Olya (also Romanized as Zābolī Maḩalleh-ye ‘Olyā; also known as Zābol Maḩalleh-ye Bālā and Zābolī Maḩalleh-ye Bālā) is a village in Jafarbay-ye Jonubi Rural District, in the Central District of Torkaman County, Golestan Province, Iran. At the 2006 census, its population was 376, in 86 families.

References 

Populated places in Torkaman County